is an interactive movie video game developed and published by Taito and Toei Company, and originally released as a laserdisc game in Japan for the arcades in 1985. It is an action game which uses full motion video (FMV) to display the on-screen action. The player must correctly choose the on-screen character's actions to progress the story. The pre-recorded animation for the game was produced by Toei Animation.

The game is set in a fictional future where time travel is possible. The protagonist, Reika, travels to different time periods in search of a criminal, Luda, from her time. After successfully tracking down Luda, Reika prevents his plans to alter the past. Time Gal was inspired by the success of earlier laserdisc video games that used pre-recorded animation, including Dragon's Lair (1983) and the previous Taito/Toei collaboration Ninja Hayate (1984), while Reika's character design bears similarities to the anime characters Lum (from Urusei Yatsura) and Yuri (from Dirty Pair).

The game was later ported to the Sega CD for a worldwide release, and also to the LaserActive in Japan. The Sega CD version received a generally favorable reception from critics.

Gameplay
Time Gal is an interactive movie game that uses pre-recorded animation rather than sprites to display the on-screen action. Gameplay is divided into levels, referred to as time periods. The game begins in 3001 AD with the theft of a time travel device. The thief, Luda, steals the device to take over the world by changing history. Reika, the protagonist also known as Time Gal, uses her own time travel device to pursue him; she travels to different time periods, such as 70,000,000 BC, 44 BC, 1588 AD, and 2010 AD, in search of Luda. Each time period is a scenario that presents a series of threats that must be avoided or confronted. Successfully navigating the sequences allows the player to progress to another period.

The player uses a joystick and button to input commands, though home versions use a game controller with a directional pad. As the game progresses, visual cues—highlighted portions of the background or foreground—will appear on the screen to help survive the dangers that occur throughout the stage; more difficult settings omit the visual cues. Depending on the location of the cue, the player will input one of four directions (up, down, left and right) or an attack (shoot the target with a laser gun). Inputting the correct command will either avoid or neutralize the threats and progress the game, while incorrect choices result in the character's death. Reika dying too many times results in a game over. Specific moments in the game involve Reika stopping time. During these moments, players are presented with a list of three options and have seven seconds to choose the one which will save the character.

Development
The game uses LaserDisc technology to stream pre-recorded animation, which was produced by Japanese studio Toei Animation. The game features raster graphics on a CRT monitor and amplified monaural sound. Mike Toole and Jeff Kapalka noted similarities between Reika's visual character design and Lum from Urusei Yatsura as well as Yuri from Dirty Pair; they speculated that the anime characters provided inspiration for Reika. Several factors prevented an overseas release: a decline in the popularity of laserdisc arcade games in the mid-80s, the expensive price of laserdisc technology, and difficulty to translate. In the original Japanese release, Reika is voiced by Yuriko Yamamoto.

Release
Since its original release to the arcades in Japan in 1985, Time Gal has been ported to different home formats. It was first released exclusively in Japan by Nippon Victor on the Video High Density format. The release of Sega CD console in 1991 spawned numerous games that took advantage of the CD technology to introduce interactive FMVs. Among the new titles, Time Gal was one of several older laserdisc-based games that were ported to the system. Renovation Products acquired the rights to publish Time Gal on the Sega CD, with Wolf Team handling development. They released it, along with similar games, as part of their "Action-Reaction" series. It was first released in Japan in November 1992, and in North America and Europe the next year. A Macintosh version was also released in Japan in 1994.

American press coverage of the Japanese release prompted video game enthusiasts to contact Renovations about a Western release. The number of requests persuaded Renovation's president, Hide Irie, to announce a release in the USA. In addition to being dubbed in English, a few death scenes in the US version were censored. The Sega CD version uses a smaller color palette than the original, includes a video gallery which requires passwords to view each level's animation sequences, and features a new opening and ending theme by Shinji Tamura and Motoi Sakuraba respectively. Time Gal was ported to the PlayStation in 1996 as a compilation with Ninja Hayate, another laserdisc arcade game developed by Taito. This release lacks the Sega CD version's additional content, but features a more accurate reproduction of the animation. The compilation was also released on the Sega Saturn the following year. The game can also be played on the Pioneer LaserActive via the Sega Mega-LD module. The LaserActive version is the rarest home release of Time Gal, as well as one of the most expensive on the system among collectors.

On April 1, 2017, Taito Classics announced that they would release several of their older games onto mobile devices, with Time Gal being its first release. The game was later released in Japan on April 5, 2017. The ability to use the game's navigational function and the ability to see the game's original concept art can be acquired through in-app purchases.

Reception

GamePro magazine noted that "Japanese players ate it up" when it first released in Japanese arcades. However, GameSetWatch's Todd Ciolek believed it was released too late in the life of LaserDisc games, and that players "were getting tired" of the genre's gameplay. He further commented that, despite its gameplay, it was unique and charming. GamePros reviewer referred to the arcade game as a "lost, laserdisc treasure", and was enthusiastic about its Sega CD release. He called the death sequences "hilarious" and felt they reduced the tediousness of dying. MEGA magazine rated the Sega CD version the number five CD game, commenting that though it lacked difficulty, it was a good showcase of the system. Prior to its Sega CD release, Electronic Gaming Monthly praised the use of CD technology and felt it would be followed by titles with similar gameplay.

Critics praised Time Gals visuals. GameFan magazine, in praising Wolfteam's port of the game, complimented the Sega CD version's graphics and short load times. GamePro said the animation is "great, with bright, vivid colors, and fast-paced, exciting movement" and praised the "funny gameplay" and "nonstop action". Chris Bieniek of VideoGames & Computer Entertainment criticized the story as "nonsensical" and said that while the unlockable video gallery is a nice feature, it effectively eliminates any replay value, which compounds the easiness of the game to give it very low longevity. He nonetheless recommended Time Gal, based chiefly on the gameplay: "Though you never really feel like you're in control of Time Gal's movements, the zany action has an undeniable appeal that takes up a lot of the slack." Shawn Sackenheim of AllGame complimented the animation, calling it "high quality", but criticized the Sega CD graphics, calling them "downgraded". He commented that, though Time Gal offered a good thrill, it lacked replay value. Ciolek echoed similar statements, saying it is more enjoyable to watch than to play. He further commented that the game is frustrating and rigid when compared to more contemporary standards. Electronic Gaming Monthlys group of reviewers praised the Sega CD version's graphics quality. Three of the four reviewers lauded the gameplay, specifically the challenge and format. The other reviewer stated he didn't care for this type of game, referring to the gameplay as "nothing more than memorizing".

Legacy
IGN's Levi Buchanan listed interactive movie games like Time Gal as one of the reasons behind the Sega CD's commercial failure, citing them as a waste of the system's capabilities. In describing the cinematic gameplay in the 2009 action game Ninja Blade, producer Masanori Takeuchi attributed the quick time event game mechanic featured in his title to laserdisc games like Dragon's Lair and Time Gal.

Todd Ciolek referred to the protagonist as one of the first human heroines in the industry. He further added that Reika was an appealing lead character that Taito could have easily turned into a mascot and featured in other games and media. The character was later included in Alfa System's shooting game Castle of Shikigami III—Taito published the arcade version in Japan. In the game, Reika features attacks and personality similar to her original debut as well as an updated visual design. Reika's also appeared in the 2011 Elevator Action remake Elevator Action Deluxe as one part of downloadable content.

Notes

References

External links
 Time Gal at MobyGames
 MSX version at Generation MSX

1985 video games
Android (operating system) games
Arcade video games
Full motion video based games
Interactive movie video games
IOS games
LaserDisc video games
MSX games
PlayStation (console) games
Sega CD games
Sega Saturn games
Sharp X1 games
Science fantasy video games
Taito games
Telenet Japan games
Video games about time travel
Toei Animation video game projects
Video games featuring female protagonists
Taito arcade games
Dinosaurs in video games
Multiplayer and single-player video games
Video games developed in Japan